The 2017–18 Maine Black Bears men's basketball team represented the University of Maine during the 2017–18 NCAA Division I men's basketball season. The Black Bears, led by fourth-year head coach Bob Walsh, played their home games at Cross Insurance Center in Bangor, Maine as members of the America East Conference. They finished the season 6–26, 3–13 in America East play to finish in eighth place. They lost to Vermont in the quarterfinals of the America East tournament.

On March 5, the school parted ways with head coach Bob Walsh and within hours hired Richard Barron, who was previously head coach Maine's women's basketball team from 2011 to 2017.

Previous season
The Black Bears finished the 2016–17 season 7–25, 3–13 in America East play to finish in a tie for eighth place. They lost in the quarterfinals of the America East tournament to Vermont.

Offseason

Departures

Incoming transfers

2017 incoming recruits

Preseason 
In a poll of the conference's nine head coaches (who were not allowed to pick their own team) at the America East media day, the Black Bears were picked to finish last in America East play.

Roster

}

Schedule and results

|-
!colspan=9 style=| Exhibition

|-
!colspan=9 style=| Non-conference regular season

|-
!colspan=9 style=| America East regular season

|-
!colspan=9 style=| America East tournament

Source

References

Maine
Maine Black Bears men's basketball seasons
Maine Black Bears men's b
Maine Black Bears men's b